Encyclops caerulea is a species of beetle in the family Cerambycidae. It was described by Say in 1826.

References

Lepturinae
Beetles described in 1826